Sherman Army Airfield is a former World War II airfield located in Pleasant Hill, California.

History
The  airfield was named after Dr. Samuel R. Sherman, who helped to provide the financing for the airfield. The field had two runways in an X-shape, with two hangars.  The PAA started in 1942 for navigation and instrument flight training with two Stinson Reliants and a Waco VKS-7. Use of the field by the PAA for navigation and instrument flight training ended in 1944. Interstate 680 has been built through the center of the former airport and not a trace of the former airport appears to remain. Houses have been built on the former property and a drive-in movie theatre once occupied the western end of the field but it is now a shopping center. Sherman Field was located northeast of the intersection of Contra Costa Boulevard and Monument Boulevard.

See also  

 California World War II Army Airfields

External links  

 Sherman

Airfields of the United States Army Air Forces in California